The Ley General de Acceso de Las Mujeres a una Vida Libre de Violencia, or General Law on Women's Access to a Life Free of Violence, was a law enacted by the Mexican government in January 2007. This bill proposes solutions to gender violence, with solutions being specific to each certain type of violence.

The first three chapters have been summarized.

Title I, Chapter I: General Dispositions

The first and foremost section of this law begins with the multiple definitions used throughout the bill and with establishing the focus and goal of eradicating gender violence in it its various, defined forms.

Articles 1-3 explicitly state that all levels of government are to work together to “prevent, sanction, and eradicate” the violence against women. These articles state that the “common sensical” preventative measures will be enacted to eradicate all types of violence against women. The Mexican government claims that the woman has inalienable human rights and that it will act to protect these rights.

Title II: Models of Violence

Chapter I: Violence in the Familial Environment

Articles 7-9 discuss the course of action to be taken in the case of domestic gender violence. It emphasizes that the state is responsible for providing free shelter, counselling, and any other services a survivor of domestic violence will need free of charge. It also explicitly denounces couples’ counselling as an acceptable approach. Also, familial violence and/or the failure for the aggressor to meet their obligations to feed and support children are grounds for losing custody of the children. it in encouraged to re- educate the aggressor with non-misogynistic views to prevent this.

Chapter II: On Labor and Faculty Violence

This following chapter focuses on the importance of classifying gender violence outside of the family environment. It addresses hierarchical roots and emphasizes sexual violence committed due to the nature of workplace hierarchies. The law here holds the Mexican government accountable for helping implement educational activities to curb violence in the workplace and in educational settings.  

This section promotes the societal stigmatization of sexual violence to stop its normalization.

Chapter III: On Violence in the Community

This short, two-article section establishes the eradication of violence within communities (i.e. public places) as a task for the Mexican government. A brief outline of the steps necessary is included, one where the government is to:

       i.           Re-education of the public sans stereotypes and the expectation to keep the public informed about current risk levels for women in the area.

      ii.           The implementation of a monitoring system towards violent individuals and states of perceived societal violence.

   iii.           The establishment of a data bank on restraining orders and those they're placed on to facilitate the exchange of information between different governmental offices

This short summarized excerpt depicts the current foundation in the legislation against gender violence in Mexico.

References 

2007 in Mexico
Women's rights in Mexico